Marcos Vinícius Bento, the Marquinhos (born 1 April 1992 in Franca) is a midfielder who plays in the Palmeiras B.

Career
Played in the Cruzeiro.

Career statistics
(Correct )

Contract
 Cruzeiro.

References

External links
 ogol
 soccerway

1992 births
Living people
Brazilian footballers
Cruzeiro Esporte Clube players
Villa Nova Atlético Clube players
Association football midfielders